"Family Man" is a song by the British-American rock band Fleetwood Mac from their 1987 studio album Tango in the Night. The song was written by Lindsey Buckingham and producer Richard Dashut. In the US, the song was released as the fifth single from the album as the follow-up to "Everywhere". It charted in April 1988, and reached No. 90 on the Billboard Hot 100 singles chart.

In the UK, "Family Man" was released as the fourth single following "Little Lies", where it debuted at No. 91 on 19 December 1987. It later went on to peak at No. 54 on 19 January 1988. Additionally, "Family Man" was released as a special limited edition box set comprising the 7" single, plus two prints by the artists Susan Young and Christine Tongue. The 12" included several mixes of "Family Man" as well as the album track, "You and I, Part II".

Cash Box called it "an engaging dance tune" with "an ethereal vocal and throbbing groove."

The song is also included on the 2002 release The Very Best of Fleetwood Mac.

Music video
Promotion for the single was limited, as Lindsey Buckingham, the song's composer, had left the group after the album's release. A video was created mixing previous footage of the band from the "Seven Wonders" video alongside archive footage of American families from the Great-Depression era. The video uses a shorter edit of the album version.

Track listing
UK 7" vinyl single (Warner Bros. Records W 8114)
"Family Man" – 4:01
"Down Endless Street" – 4:24

UK 12" vinyl single (Warner Bros. Records W 8114 T)
"Family Man" (Extended Vocal Remix) – 8:30
"Family Party" (Bonus Beats) – 4:56
"You and I, Part II" – 2:56

12" US single (Warner Brothers Records 0–20842)  
"Family Man" (Extended vocal remix) – 8:30
"Family Man" (I'm a Jazz Man dub) – 8:52
"Family Man" (Extended guitar remix) – 6:26
"Family Party" (bonus beats) – 4:36
"Down Endless Street" – 4:24

Personnel
Lindsey Buckingham – lead and backing vocals, guitars, bass guitar, keyboards, Fairlight CMI, drum and percussion programming
Christine McVie – backing vocals
John McVie – bass guitar
Mick Fleetwood – drums, percussion

Chart positions

References

The Great Rock Discography, 6th Edition, Martin C. Strong. .

Songs about families
1987 singles
Fleetwood Mac songs
Songs written by Lindsey Buckingham
Song recordings produced by Richard Dashut
1987 songs
Warner Records singles
Songs written by Richard Dashut